Kärkkäinen (formerly J. Kärkkäinen) is a department store chain in Ylivieska, Finland. It was established in 1988. In 2016, it was the fourth largest discount store chain in Finland after Tokmanni, HalpaHalli and Motonet. In addition to Ylivieska, the company has also stores in Oulu, Ii, Lahti and Jyväskylä, and it also own an online store.

In 2010, Kärkkäinen applied for corporate restructuring, because the company had a total of more than EUR 37 million in restructuring debt. The district court drew up a ten-year repayment program for the company. The corporate restructuring program ended in August 2020.

In a brand valuation survey conducted by Markkinointi & Mainonta in 2018, Kärkkäinen was the least valued of the seven discount store brands. This is widely thought to be due to the controversy surrounding the company and its CEO, which stemmed from anti-Semitic articles in the company’s free newspaper distribution, including in Magneettimedia. The connections of the free newspaper distribution to the neo-Nazi organization Finnish Resistance Movement have also been detrimental to the company's reputation. Largely due to the uproar, many companies do not sell their products in Kärkkäinen's stores; Finlayson, Fiskars and Otava, among others, have terminated the cooperation.

In 2021, Juha Kärkkäinen urged his employees in an internal email not to take the coronavirus vaccine. The message was accompanied by a link to MV-media's website.

Sources

References

External links 

Companies of Finland
Department stores of Finland
Discount stores